The 2012 Curlers Corner Autumn Gold Curling Classic was held from October 5 to 8 at the Calgary Curling Club in Calgary, Alberta as part of the 2012–13 World Curling Tour. It was the first women's Grand Slam event of the 2012–13 curling season, and this edition marked the twenty-seventh time the tournament has been held. The event was held in a 32-team triple-knockout event, and the purse for the event was CAD$54,000. In the final, Sherry Middaugh defeated Rachel Homan with a score of 8–4.

Teams

Knockout Brackets

A Event

B Event

C Event

Playoffs

References

External links
Event Home Page

Autumn Gold Curling Classic
2012 in Canadian curling
2012 in women's curling